Bendayan is a surname. Notable people with the surname include:

Alegría Bendayán de Bendelac (1928–2020), Venezuelan philologist, professor, writer and Jewish poet
Amador Bendayán (1920–1989), Venezuelan actor and entertainer of Moroccan Jewish descent
Ali Ben Dayan, sometimes Ali Bendayan (born 1943), Moroccan footballer
Dedi Ben Dayan (born 1978), Israeli footballer
Rachel Bendayan (born 1979), Canadian Member of Parliament